Huskvarna (formerly spelled Husqvarna) constitutes the eastern part of Jönköping, a city in the Swedish province of Småland, and has a population of about 24,000. The distance to central Jönköping is about 5 km. The name Huskvarna translates to House Mill.

Between 1911 and 1970, it was a city municipality of its own. It geographically grew together with Jönköping in the 1950s. Since the local government reform in 1971, it is administratively within Jönköping Municipality.

History
A royal rifle manufacturer was established in Husqvarna, as it was originally spelled, in 1689, and lasted until 1757, when it was sold to private owners.  It continued to supply the Swedish and Norwegian armies with rifles (for example, in 1870, some 10,000 rifles were finished), but the company later switched to the production of sewing machines and bicycles. Today, it is known as Husqvarna AB, an internationally known company with a variety of products.

Coat of arms
The arms (1911) depict rifles and their ignition.

Sport
The International Floorball Federation was founded in Huskvarna in 1986.

Notable residents
Mona Johannesson, Swedish model
Denni Avdić, association football player
Emma Sjöberg, Swedish top model. Married to Hans Wiklund

Notes and references

See also
 Ebbe power station
 Husqvarna (disambiguation)
 Husqvarna AB, the company

External links

Huskvarna From official municipal website
 article Huskvarna from Nordisk familjebok

 
Populated lakeshore places in Sweden
Cities in Jönköping County